MFX or mfx may refer to:

 Manx Financial Group, London Stock Exchange symbol MFX
 MFX, the IATA code for Méribel Altiport, Savoie, France
 MFX, the ISO 639-3 code for Melo language, Ethiopia
 Multi effects, a pedal or device that contains many different electronic effects